The Norwalk rail accident occurred on May 6, 1853, in Norwalk, Connecticut, and was the first major U.S. railroad bridge disaster; 48 were killed when a train travelling at 50 mph plunged into the Norwalk Harbor off of an open draw (swing) bridge.

The accident occurred on the New York and New Haven Railroad where it crosses a small inlet of Long Island Sound via a swing bridge. The approach from New York is around a sharp curve, so there was a signal indicating if the bridge was passable by trains: a red ball mounted upon a tall pole.

At 08:00 that morning, the Boston express left New York with 200 passengers driven by a substitute driver for whom this was the third transit of the route. The train consisted of two baggage and five passenger cars. On approaching the bridge, the driver neglected to check the signal and only became aware that the bridge was open when within  of it. The bridge had been opened for the passage of the steamship Pacific, which had just passed through. The driver applied the brakes and reversed the engine, but was unable to stop in time. He and the fireman leapt clear before the bridge and escaped serious injury. The baggage cars came to rest atop the locomotive; the front of the first passenger car was crushed against the baggage cars and then submerged as the second passenger car came to rest on top of it. The third passenger car broke in two; the front half hanging down over the edge of the abutment; the rear remaining on the track. Most of the 48 dead and 30 injured were in the first passenger car. A further eight people were reported missing.

Many doctors were travelling on the train, returning from the Sixth Annual Meeting of the American Medical Association in New York; seven of them were killed. Amongst the unhurt was Dr. Gurdon Wadsworth Russell, who wrote an account of the accident for the Hartford Courant in which he says that the dead "presented all the symptoms of asphyxia from drowning, and were probably drowned at once, being confined and pressed by broken cars. Oh, what a melancholy scene that!"

As a result of the public panic and indignation caused by the accident, the Connecticut Legislature imposed a law requiring every train in the state to come to a dead halt before crossing any opening bridge. The engineer was charged with gross negligence and held primarily responsible for the disaster.

A similar accident occurred eleven years later in Canada with even greater loss of life, the St-Hilaire train disaster.

References

Railway accidents and incidents in Connecticut
Bridge disasters in the United States
Bridge disasters involving open moveable bridges
Railway accidents in 1853
1853 in Connecticut
History of Norwalk, Connecticut
Accidents and incidents involving New York, New Haven and Hartford Railroad
Long Island Sound
Railway accidents involving a signal passed at danger
May 1853 events
Rail accidents caused by a driver's error
Events in Fairfield County, Connecticut